Claudio Javier López (born 17 July 1974) is an Argentine former footballer, who played as a forward. Nicknamed Piojo (louse), he is best known for his spells with Valencia in Spain and Lazio in Italy. López also had a notable impact in the Argentina national team, participating in two World Cups.

Club career

Early career
López began his professional career with Estudiantes de La Plata in his native Argentina in 1990 as a 16-year-old. However, he moved to Racing the next year, where he would remain until he transferred in 1996 to Spanish club Valencia.

Europe
After a slow start in 1996–97, Claudio López would enjoy a prolific spell with Valencia over the 3 years that followed, averaging 20 goals each season between 1997–98 and 1999–2000. That included a season best in 1998–99 which saw him find the net on 30 occasions across competitions to become the club's top scorer (3rd best in la Liga behind Raul and Rivaldo, despite taking fewer penalties than his rivals).

Valencia entrenched their status as one of Spain's emerging clubs throughout the late 1990s, rising from their usual mid-table position to 4th in 1998–99 and 3rd in 1999–2000, which was Lopez's last season with the club. The Argentine formed a devastating partnership with Romanian Adrian Ilie and played alongside such stars as Jocelyn Angloma, Santiago Cañizares and Gaizka Mendieta, who would later be his teammate at Lazio as well.

López remained with Valencia for five years, helping the team to the final of the UEFA Champions League in the 1999–2000 season, when he was transferred to Lazio of Serie A for €35 million. During the first half of his spell in Italy's capital, he was partnered with compatriot Hernán Crespo in the front-line. However, López suffered from injury problems during his time at Lazio. During the 2000–2001 UEFA Champions League, he scored a direct goal from a corner kick against Anderlecht in the Stadio Olimpico.

After Crespo left for Inter in the summer of 2002, López was partnered with newcomer Bernardo Corradi. They formed a solid partnership that yielded a combined 25 Serie A goals as Lazio finished 4th to qualify for the Champions League under new coach Roberto Mancini. The Argentine scored 15 of those goals, his best league tally during his years in Italy; the 4th-place finish for Lazio was also the best the club would achieve until 2011–12.

In December 2002 he made headlines during a Serie A clash with Inter that ended 3-3: after netting a hat-trick that gave his side a 3-0 lead, Claudio López improvised an "Aserejé" goal celebration with teammate Bernardo Corradi, inspired by the dance routine of Spanish band Las Ketchup. In an interview 13 years later, he explained that the unexpected celebration had happened because "crazy Corradi enjoyed doing such things!"

In the UEFA Cup, López found the net twice to help his team reach the semi-finals, where they would be knocked out by the eventual winners, Jose Mourinho's FC Porto. The following season was less successful for Lazio as they only finished 6th in Serie A and crashed out of the Champions League at the group stage. Claudio López only found the net 4 times in 36 appearances. He did manage, however, to win his second piece of silverware with the Roman club as they overcame Juventus in the two-legged Coppa Italia Final.

Mexico, return to Racing
López joined Club América for the 2004 Apertura, where he played in 17 games, scoring four goals. The following season, Clausura 2005 brought better results, with López scoring a total of 14 goals overall and helping the team to its tenth League championship in its history. It was his first and only league championship with any team. Claudio was instrumental to the team's success, also helping them win the CONCACAF Champions' Cup by scoring two goals in the Final over Tecos UAG. He played the 2006 FIFA Club World Cup.

In 2007 López returned to Racing, 11 years after his departure from the club, and the country. In most of those games, usually coming in as a late sub, López scored several important goals.

Major League Soccer
On 7 March 2008, it was announced López had signed with the Kansas City Wizards on a free transfer. López fell under the league's designated player qualification, which means only the first $415,000 of his salary counted against Kansas City Wizards’ team salary cap. He later had his contract restructured to take him below designated player status.
 He scored on his debut for Kansas City against D.C. United on 29 March 2008.

On 23 February 2010 the Argentine striker left after two seasons Kansas City Wizards. "We would have liked to have Claudio back in 2010, but unfortunately it became clear early in the contract negotiations that we could not give him what he desired," Wizards Manager Peter Vermes said.

López was later signed by league rivals Colorado Rapids on 2 April 2010.

After the 2010 MLS season Colorado declined López's contract option and Lopez elected to participate in the 2010 MLS Re-Entry Draft. López became a free agent in Major League Soccer when he was not selected in the Re-Entry draft.

International career
López had a distinguished career with Argentina. After winning a silver medal with the Under-23 team during the 1996 Summer Olympics, López made appearances in both the 1998 and 2002 World Cups. He scored a goal against the Netherlands in the 1998 FIFA World Cup quarter-final, when he kicked the ball between Edwin van der Sar's legs to tie the match temporarily, although Argentina were ultimately defeated 2–1.

Style of play
A talented, hardworking, and well-rounded forward, with notable tactical intelligence and versatility, López was capable of playing anywhere along the front-line, as a striker, in a supporting role, and on the wing. He was highly regarded for his pace, technique, and dribbling skills, as well as his powerful striking ability with his left foot. He was also an effective set-piece and penalty taker. Throughout his career, he was known by the nickname "El Piojo", meaning "the louse".

Media
López was sponsored by sportswear company Nike and appeared in Nike commercials. In a global Nike advertising campaign in the run-up to the 2002 World Cup in Korea and Japan, he starred in a "Secret Tournament" commercial (branded "Scopion KO") directed by Terry Gilliam, appearing alongside football players such as Thierry Henry, Ronaldo, Edgar Davids, Fabio Cannavaro, Francesco Totti, Ronaldinho, Luís Figo and Hidetoshi Nakata, with former player Eric Cantona the tournament "referee".

Career statistics

Club

International

Honours 
Valencia
 Copa del Rey: 1998–99
 Supercopa de España: 1999
 UEFA Intertoto Cup: 1998

Lazio
 Coppa Italia: 2003–04
 Supercoppa Italiana: 2000

América
 Primera División de México: Clausura 2005
 Campeón de Campeones: 2005
 CONCACAF Champions' Cup: 2006

Colorado Rapids
 MLS Cup: 2010
 MLS Eastern Conference: 2010

See also
List of current MLS players with national team caps

References

External links
 
 
 Profile and statistics of Claudio López at Football Database
 
 Argentine Primera statistics at Fútbol XXI  
 

Argentine footballers
Argentina international footballers
Association football forwards
Club América footballers
Estudiantes de La Plata footballers
Racing Club de Avellaneda footballers
S.S. Lazio players
Valencia CF players
Sporting Kansas City players
Colorado Rapids players
Serie A players
La Liga players
Expatriate footballers in Italy
Expatriate footballers in Spain
Expatriate footballers in Mexico
Expatriate soccer players in the United States
Olympic footballers of Argentina
Olympic silver medalists for Argentina
Footballers at the 1996 Summer Olympics
1998 FIFA World Cup players
2002 FIFA World Cup players
Sportspeople from Córdoba Province, Argentina
Argentine sportspeople of Spanish descent
1974 births
Living people
Argentine expatriate footballers
Argentine Primera División players
Liga MX players
Major League Soccer players
Argentine expatriate sportspeople in Italy
Argentine expatriate sportspeople in Mexico
Argentine expatriate sportspeople in Spain
Argentine expatriate sportspeople in the United States
Olympic medalists in football
Designated Players (MLS)
Medalists at the 1996 Summer Olympics